Kalanganeh (also Romanized as Kalangāneh, Galangāneh, Kalangona, and Kolangāneh; also known as Gīlangān) is a village in Silakhor Rural District, Silakhor District, Dorud County, Lorestan Province, Iran. At the 2006 census, its population was 606, in 157 families.

References 

Towns and villages in Dorud County